Hungary has been participating at the  Deaflympics since its inception in 1924 and has earned a total of 132 medals.

Hungary has also competed at the Winter Deaflympics in 2015, the only Winter Deaflympic event that Hungary has participated.

Medal tallies

See also
Hungary at the Paralympics
Hungary at the Olympics

References

External links
Deaflympics official website
2017 Deaflympics